The koteka, also referred to as a horim or penis gourd, is a penis sheath traditionally worn by native male inhabitants of some (mainly highland) ethnic groups in New Guinea to cover their penises. The koteka is normally made from a dried-out gourd, Lagenaria siceraria, although unrelated species such as pitcher-plant (Nepenthes mirabilis) are also used. The koteka is held in place by a small loop of fiber attached to the base of the koteka and placed around the scrotum. A secondary loop placed around the chest or abdomen is attached to the main body of the koteka.

Men choose kotekas similar to ones worn by other men in their respective cultural groups. For example, Yali men favour long, thin kotekas that help hold up the multiple rattan hoops worn around their waists, whereas men from Tiom wear double gourds held up with strips of cloth and use the space between the two gourds for carrying small items such as money and tobacco.

Traditions 

The koteka is traditional clothing in certain New Guinea highlands societies, including in the Grand Baliem Valley of Western New Guinea and the Ok Tedi and Telefomin regions of Papua New Guinea. The koteka is worn without other clothing and is tied in an upward position.

Tribal identification 
Many tribes can be identified by the way they wear the koteka. The koteka may be pointed straight out, straight up, or at an angle. The diameter of the koteka can also be distinctive to an individual tribe. Contrary to popular belief, there is little correlation between the size or length of the koteka and the social status of the wearer. Kotekas of different sizes serve different purposes; a very short koteka is worn when working, and a longer and more elaborate koteka is worn on festive occasions. 

The koteka is made of a specially grown gourd. Stone weights are tied to the bottom of the gourd to stretch it out as it grows. Curves can be made in it by the use of string to restrain its growth in whatever direction the grower wishes; the koteka can be quite elaborately shaped in this manner. When harvested, the gourd is emptied and dried. It is sometimes waxed with beeswax or resin. It can be painted or have shells, feathers and other decorations attached to it.

The term koteka is used as a name of tribal groups across the highlands of New Guinea, in both West Papua and Papua New Guinea. For example, in West Papua today, there is an Assembly of Koteka Tribes. It is also used to identify a tribal group within Melanesia across the highlands of New Guinea.

Attempted eradication 
In 1971–1972, the Indonesian New Order government launched "Operasi Koteka" ("Operation Penis Gourd") which consisted primarily of trying to encourage the people to wear shorts and shirts because such clothes were considered more "modern." But the people did not have changes of clothing, did not have soap, and were unfamiliar with the care of such clothing, so the unwashed clothing caused skin diseases. There were also reports of men wearing the shorts as hats and the women using the dresses as carrying bags.

Eventually, the campaign was abandoned. Nevertheless, shirts and pants are required in government buildings, and children are required to wear them in school.

Phallocrypts 

Phallocrypts are decorative penis sheaths worn in parts of New Guinea during traditional ceremonies. They are usually made out of gourds or woven fibers and decorated with feathers, beads, cowry shells, and small metal ornaments. The most elaborate phallocrypts are sold to tourists as souvenirs and are not usually representative of ones actually used in ceremonies.

Use in other regions
Some native tribes in South America and Africa have used penis sheaths.

Penis sheaths were sometimes worn by ancient Romans. Roman singers often wore penis sheaths because they believed that doing so would help to preserve their voices. Penis sheaths were also worn by slaves and others to avoid sex.

See also 

 Codpiece
 Kynodesme
 Namba (clothing)

References

Further reading

 "Koteka! Size is Not a Sign of Status" Article on website of West Papua Action Network.
 "Tribe caught in a time warp," by Kenneth L. Whiting, Chicago Sun-Times, May 14, 1987, page 47.
 "Stone Age Ways Surviving, Barely," by Calvin Sims, New York Times, March 11, 2001, page 1.8. (Also linked at https://web.archive.org/web/20060901083829/http://environment.uchicago.edu/studies/courses/archive/2001/es212/daily_notes/stoneage.doc)
 Phallocrypts from Papua New Guinea and Papua (Irian Jaya), Indonesia Article on website of Art-Pacific.com. Note illustration of man wearing a "koteka" made from a flashlight rather than a gourd.
 The Dani in the Baliem Valley Article on website, Tom-Toms of Time: Mysterious Indonesia.
 Penis Gourds from Papua New Guinea Article on "Pilot Destination Guide" website.
 Ethnobotany of the Yali of West Papua  by William Milliken, Royal Botanic Garden, Edinburgh.
 "Lipstick Girls" and "Fallen Women": AIDS and Conspiratorial Thinking in Papua, Indonesia," by Leslie Butt. Cultural Anthropology, August 2005, Volume 20, Issue 3, page 412.
 "Indonesia: Cover up," The Economist. July 29, 1995, Volume 336, Issue 7925, page 28.
 Ucko, Peter J. (1969): "Penis sheaths: a comparative study." in Proceedings of the Royal Anthropological Institute of Great Britain and Ireland for 1969.

Melanesian clothing
Folk costumes
Human penis
Indonesian culture
Papua New Guinean culture
Anthropology
Western New Guinea
Minimalist clothing